"Changed It" is a song by Trinidadian-born rapper Nicki Minaj and American rapper Lil Wayne. Produced by Motiv, Detail, and Sidney Swift, the song was released as a single on March 10, 2017 by Young Money Entertainment, Cash Money Records and Republic Records, along with "No Frauds" and "Regret in Your Tears".

Background and release 
On March 10, 2017, Nicki Minaj dropped three singles: "Regret in Your Tears", "Changed It" with Lil Wayne, and "No Frauds" with Drake and Lil Wayne, that were to be included on her upcoming fourth studio album. However, these singles were ultimately omitted from the final tracklist of Queen released the following year.

When all three singles debuted on the Billboard Hot 100, Minaj became the woman with the most entries on that chart at 76 songs, beating Aretha Franklin's record of 73 entries on the chart.

Charts

Release history

References

External links 
 Lyrics of the song on Genius

2017 songs
2017 singles
Nicki Minaj songs
Lil Wayne songs
Songs written by Nicki Minaj
Songs written by Lil Wayne
Young Money Entertainment singles
Cash Money Records singles
Republic Records singles
Songs written by Detail (record producer)
Song recordings produced by Detail (record producer)
Songs written by Sidney Swift